The 1935 All-Ireland Minor Hurling Championship was the eighth staging of the All-Ireland Minor Hurling Championship since its establishment by the Gaelic Athletic Association in 1928.

Tipperary entered the championship as the defending champions in search of a fourth successive title.

On 1 September 1935 Kilkenny won the championship following a 4-2 to 3-3 defeat of Tipperary in the All-Ireland final. This was their second All-Ireland and their first in four championship seasons.

Results

All-Ireland Minor Hurling Championship

Semi-finals

Final

Championship statistics

Miscellaneous

 Kilkenny became the second team to win more than one All-Ireland title.

External links
 All-Ireland Minor Hurling Championship: Roll Of Honour

Minor
All-Ireland Minor Hurling Championship